NBCC (India) Limited, formerly known as National Buildings Construction Corporation is a central public sector enterprise  under the Ministry of Housing and Urban Affairs, Government of India.

The central public sector undertaking's present areas of operations are categorized into three main segments, i.e. (i) Project Management Consultancy (PMC), including redevelopment of government properties, (ii) Engineering, Procurement & Construction (EPC) and (iii) Real Estate Development.

NBCC acquired 100 per cent stake in Mini Ratna hospital consultancy firm Hospital Services Consultancy Corporation Limited (HSCC) from Ministry of Health and Family Welfare on 6 November 2018.  The organization acquired over 51% stake in Hindustan Steelworks Construction Limited (HSCL), a PSU under the Steel Ministry in 2017.

NBCC is headquartered in the city of New Delhi, India and it has 31 regional offices across India. The projects undertaken by the company are located across India and in countries such as Iraq, Libya, Nepal, Mauritius, Turkey, Botswana, Maldives, Yemen, Oman, UAE, Dubai and Africa.  The organization has executed several landmark projects that include re-development of government properties, construction of Roads, Railway Stations, Hospitals & Medical Colleges, Institutions, Offices, Bridges, and Industrial & Environmental Structures.

NBCC is designated as the implementing agency for executing projects under the Atal Mission for Rejuvenation and Urban Transformation (AMRUT), Pradhan Mantri Gram Sadak Yojna (PMGSY), Solid Waste Management (SWM) and developmental work in North Eastern Region.

NBCC is also working as Project Management Consultant (PMC) for the redevelopment of Pragati Maidan project of India Trade Promotion Organisation. A number of Central Government ministries and various State Governments have been utilizing the services of NBCC as their extended engineering arm.

Functional setup 
NBCC has its Corporate Office at New Delhi which works as a policy maker, planner and overall controller. Corporate functions are managed through various organizational divisions viz. Project Management Group, Business Development, Real Estate, Vigilance, Contract Engineering, Law, Centralized Procurement Group (CPG), Finance, Corporate communication, Personnel & Administration.

The work of the corporation is further decentralized into various Regional Business Groups (RBGs), Strategic Business Groups (SBGs), Zones, Units and Sites. RBG/SBG/Zones are controlled by executives of the rank of ED/CGM/GM respectively who directly reports to the Director(s) sitting in HO.

Regional Business Groups and Strategic Business Group headquarters are located at Delhi as well as at other places in all the states depending upon the quantum and the nature of the projects. RBGs are headed by Executive Director; SBGs by CGM & Zones are headed by GM/AGM and are assisted in their work by Technical, Finance & P&A Staff of appropriate level. RBGs/SBGs/Zones control and look after several projects which are headed by Unit-in-Charges.

Each project is a profit centre and is expected to operate efficiently to achieve turnover targets and profitability as per MoU signed between the corporate office and the RBG/SBG/Zonal Heads. The units are headed by an officer of the rank of AGM/DGM/PM/DPM/SPE. The Unit In-charge is responsible for efficient execution of a project and within approved cost who is assisted by other Technical staff depending upon the nature and value of project. The unit In-charge, from time to time, appraises the Zonal In-charge about providing the requisite inputs / resources required for the execution of the work.

Project site is controlled by a Site In-charge. The project is provided with the required number of technical staff. The site in-charge is responsible for efficient execution of the project ensuring its timely completion.

The Job Description and Duties & Responsibilities of various Heads are given below:

 (A) RBG/SBG/Zonal Heads
 1.	Achieve turnover target within the specified cost/time for delivery of determined profit.
 2.	Function strictly as per the delegation of powers/financial rules in the matter of award of work and purchase of articles/goods, machines/equipments relating to works and establishment.
 3.	Maintain discipline and administrative efficiency in all the offices within the jurisdiction.
 4.	Motivate and develop the subordinates at all levels of hierarchy. To procure works in the Zone.
 5.	To conduct technical inspection of the work of the units.
 6.	Liaisoning with client/State Govt. & other bodies at appropriate levels.
 (B) RBG/SBG/Zonal Finance Incharges
 1.	Overall Incharge of Finance Section of the Zone. All financial matter/decisions are required to be taken with the concurrence of Zonal Finance Incharge.
 2.	Compliance of statutory provision in the area of tax/levy/cess and industrial law.
 3.	Compliance of contractual terms and conditions with the contractors, consultants and other vendors and apprising/advising RBG/SBG/Zonal Heads/HO on these issues.
 4.	Maintaining all financial records/data, Books of accounts, returns and reports, approvals, Bills of vendors etc. in respect of all the projects under the RBG/SBG/Zone
 5.	To observe functioning in RBG/SBG/Zones as per Delegation of Powers issued by the Corporate Office.
 (C) Unit Incharges
 1.	Responsible for efficient management of the unit.
 2.	To organise site work efficiently and ensure timely completion of the work. Responsible for overall performance of the unit which includes execution of the work in accordance with the acceptable standards.
 3.	Responsible for 100% test check of each RA bill.
 4.	Maintaining all records of the work done, mandatory site registers, quality reports, approvals and bills of vendors etc. in respect of the project.
 5.	To ensure working in units as per Delegation of Powers issued by the Corporate Office.

History
NBCC was incorporated in 1960 as a wholly owned Government of India enterprise under the erstwhile Ministry of Works, Housing & Supply (MoWHS), which is now known as the Ministry of Housing and Urban Affairs (MoHUA).

In 1977, NBCC started its overseas operations.

In 2007, NBCC paid a dividend to the Government of India for the first time and since then, it has been paying a dividend every year. In the year 2008, the Department of Public Enterprises of the Ministry of Heavy Industries and Public Enterprises, through its office memorandum No. 9(8)/2008-GM dated 3 October 2008 accorded the approval of the Ministry of Housing and Urban Affairs upgrading NBCC from a Schedule "B" public sector enterprise to a Schedule "A" public sector enterprise. Subsequently, on 14 October 2008, the NBCC was granted Schedule "A" PSU status.

NBCC launched an IPO in April 2012 and was listed in BSE and NSE. In September 2012, NBCC was granted the Mini Ratna- I status by the Government of India.

The Government of India granted the status of a 'Navratna Company' to NBCC with effect from 23 June 2014. The status of a 'Navratna PSE' made NBCC eligible to invest up to Rs 1,000 crore without the requirement of explicit government approval.

In October 2014, NBCC set up its wholly owned subsidiary NBCC Services Limited (NSL). In 2021, NBCC’s order book had projects worth Rs.60,000 Crore.

Business segments

The Business Model of NBCC is categorized into three domains. They are project management consultancy (PMC), Engineering Procurement and Construction (EPC) and Real Estate Development.

Project Management Consultancy (PMC): NBCC majorly works as a consultant on projects from concept stage to completion & maintenance. The company earns 93% of its revenue through consultation fees paid by the government body responsible for the project.
Engineering Procurement and Construction (EPC): NBCC constructs cooling towers, chimneys, coal plants and ESIC hospitals through EPC services by doing feasibility studies, procurement, construction, designs and conceptualization among others. The public sector behemoth acts as an EPC agency and also engages with various government departments for project clearances. EPC revenues are a minuscule percentage of company's trade.
Real Estate Development: NBCC started real estate development in 1988. As of March 2019, it has been working as a land management agency for 10 CPSE’s which include, HMT Watches, Hindustan Cables, Indian Drugs and Pharmaceuticals Ltd to create cost effective housing projects.

Revenue generation/redevelopment model: NBCC has been focussing on self-sustaining revenue generation model by taking up redevelopment  of residential apartments for government employees and railway stations. It commercially develops the adjoining land parcels in the vicinity of the projects and makes it entirely self-sustainable. The major projects executed through this model are the GPRA colonies at New Moti Bagh and East Kidwai Nagar, New Delhi.

Overseas Operations 
In 1977, NBCC started working on international construction & infrastructure projects in the Middle East and African countries. The company has been engaged in the construction of National Prison Academy in Maldives, Supreme Court building and Social Housing project in Mauritius, Mahatma Gandhi International Convention Centres in 9 African countries and the India Pavilion at the Expo 2020

Subsidiaries and Joint Ventures
NBCC has formed subsidiaries and Joint Ventures for construction and & infrastructure projects in India and abroad.

 NBCC Services Limited
 NBCC Gulf LLC
 NBCC Engineering & Consultancy Ltd.
 Hindustan Steel Works Construction Ltd
 Real Estate Development & Construction Corporation of Rajasthan Ltd.
NBCC Environment Engineering Limited
NBCC International Limited
Hospital Services Consultancy Corporation Limited (HSCC)

Projects

National 

 Indo – Bangladesh/Indo-Pak border fencing works
 1200 bedded hospital and medical college at Guwahati, Assam
 Twin Tower World Trade Centre at Guwahati, Assam
 Hospitals for ESIC all across the country
 Solid Waste Management projects in 8 Airfield towns in India
Bhubaneshwar and Mysore Airports
 NBCC Green View, Sector 37-D, Gurgaon
 VIBGYOR Towers, Kolkata- 876 flats/8 towers Residential Real Estate project
 NBCC Plaza, Saket, New Delhi- Commercial Real Estate project
 LEED certified Green Building project named Indian Institute of Corporate Affairs (IICA) of the Ministry of Corporate Affairs at Manesar, Haryana
 Headquarter buildings for NIA, CBI, WHO in Delhi 
 Redevelopment of 10 railway stations 
 Construction of IITs, AIIMS and IIMs
Farakka Super Thermal Power Project chimney for NTPC in West Bengal
Constructions of two chimneys for NTPC at Barh, Bihar

Overseas
 Water Treatment Plant at Kirkuk, Iraq
 Bir Hospital in Nepal
 Construction, furnishing and equipping of 200 bedded Indira Gandhi Memorial Medical Hospital at Male, Maldives
 48 km Kohalpur Mahakali Highway Project, Nepal
Baghdad University
 Museum and Library Building, Hetauda, Nepal
 1000 Houses at Bani Walid and 432 houses at Ghat, Libya
 Runway and Terminal building at Ghat and Brak Airport, Libya
 Construction of 774 housing units of Dawran, Dhamar, Yemen
 Project Management Consultancy for 3600 housing units at Meer Project in Turkey
 Hotel Ninevah Oberoi at Mousul, Baghdad
 New Supreme Court, (Mauritius)
Construction of 2000 social housing units at Hulhumale,Maldives

Sustainable construction

NBCC has adopted a policy to incorporate sustainable green features into its projects. The features include  Zero waste ,  Dual piping,  Rainwater harvesting, Solar energy, smart electricity metering, and LED/energy efficient fixtures. The projects undertaken by the company conform to Green Building norms. The company makes use of environment friendly techniques  and materials such as steel structures, modular construction, pre-cast, pre-fab components and light weight concrete slabs

The company also ensures strict compliance with the guidelines to curb air and water pollution at its project sites in its bid to contribute towards a safer environment.

Financial performance
 NBCC's total income stood at INR 10151.37 Cr in 2018-19.
 In the same period (2018–19) profit after tax stands at INR 391.64 Cr
 Order pipeline of INR 75,000cr approx.
 Net Worth: INR 1508.41 Cr.

References

External links
 News Coverage at Mint (newspaper)
 Informational Coverage at Mint (newspaper)
 Collective News and Coverage at Business Standard
 Profile and Stock Overview at Reuters
 Profile and Stock Overview at The Financial Express
 Collective News and Coverage at The Economic Times
 Bombay Stock Exchange index at Bombay Stock Exchange
 News Coverage at The Times of India
 Project News and PMC coverage at Projects Today

Indian companies established in 1960
Construction and civil engineering companies of India
Ministry of Urban Development
Construction and civil engineering companies established in 1960
1960 establishments in Delhi
Companies listed on the National Stock Exchange of India
Companies listed on the Bombay Stock Exchange